Pennsylvania held statewide municipal elections on November 3, 2009, to fill a number of judicial positions and to allow judicial retention votes. The necessary primary elections were held on May 19, 2009.

Justice of the Supreme Court
Voters were asked to fill a single vacancy on the Supreme Court of Pennsylvania. The vacant seat had been occupied by Jane Cutler Greenspan, who had agreed as a condition of her interim appointment in 2008 not to seek a full term on the court. Vying for the seat in the general election were Republican Joan Orie Melvin of Allegheny County and Democrat Jack A. Panella of Northampton County, both of whom were then serving on the Superior Court of Pennsylvania. Orie Melvin won the seat with 53 percent of the vote, restoring the 4–3 Republican majority that had existed on the court prior to the 2007 state election. Panella raised $2.4 million for the campaign, compared to $734,000 for Orie Melvin. Low voter turnout, especially in Panella's native Philadelphia, played a key role in Orie Melvin's victory.

Judge of the Superior Court

Four seats on the Superior Court were up for grabs. On the ballot in the general election were four Republicans, four Democrats, and one Libertarian.

Republican candidate Judy Olson won the most votes, followed by fellow Republicans Sallie Mundy and Paula Ott. There was a four-way near tie for fourth place, with Democrat Anne E. Lazarus in the lead (with 11.5% of the vote) but closely trailed by Democrat Robert J. Colville (11.4%), Republican Temp Smith (11.4%), and Democrat Kevin Francis McCarthy (11.3%). The close results triggered an optional automatic recount. While candidates Colville and McCarthy opted out of the recount, Smith declined to do so, prompting Secretary of State Pedro Cortés to order a recount to begin on November 18—the first automatic statewide recount in Pennsylvania history. On December 1, the Pennsylvania Department of State announced that the recount had been completed, with the results essentially unchanged; Lazarus won the fourth seat. The cost of the recount was $542,000.

Judge of the Commonwealth Court

There were two open seats on the Commonwealth Court of Pennsylvania. The Candidates in the General Election were selected in the Pennsylvania Municipal Primary Election which was held May 19, 2009.  The two leading Republican candidates in the Primary were Patricia A. McCullough (36.2%) and Kevin Brobson (35.9%), followed by Al Frioni (27.9%).  The two leading Democratic candidates were Barbara Behrend Ernsberger (22.0%) and Linda Judson (21.1%) followed by Jimmy Lynn (15.3%) Michael Sherman (14.9%) Stephen Pollok (13.5%) and Daniel Brickmont (13.3%).  The General Election was held on Tuesday November 3, 2009.

Judicial retention

Superior Court 
Voters elected to retain Judge Kate Ford Elliott on the Superior Court.

Commonwealth Court 
Voters elected to retain Judge Dan Pellegrini on the Commonwealth Court.

References

2009 Pennsylvania elections
Pennsylvania